Between 1870 and 1872, the Football Association (FA) organised five representative association football matches between teams representing England and Scotland, all held in London. The first of these matches was held at The Oval on 5 March 1870, and the fifth was on 21 February 1872. The matches, which were organised by Charles W. Alcock, are the precursors to modern international football and were referred to as internationals at the time. They are not recognised, however, as full internationals by FIFA as the players competing in the Scotland team were drawn only from London-based Scottish players. They were followed by the 1872 match in Glasgow between Scotland and England which is recognised as the first international match.

The first match

The 1870 match was initiated by Charles W. Alcock who placed advertisements in Scottish newspapers, including the following letter in the Glasgow Herald on 3 November 1870 regarding the second of the five fixtures:

The first match, then, was organised by the FA and resulted in a 1–1 draw. The match was delayed two weeks from its advertised date due to excessive frost which had made the ground "dangerously unfit for play". Alcock captained the England team whilst Scotland were led by James Kirkpatrick. The match was 0–0 when the teams changed end at half-time – a rule that The Sporting Gazette of Saturday 12 March 1870 described as new – but Scotland took a lead through a goal by Robert Crawford after England had moved their goalkeeper upfield. England fought back to score through Baker to salvage a draw before the end of the game. W. H. Gladstone, an MP and son of the sitting Prime Minister W. E. Gladstone, appeared for Scotland and, according to the Manchester Guardian, "did good service on the part of the Scottish team".

Subsequent matches
The following four matches were held on: 19 November 1870, 25 February 1871, 17 November 1871 and 24 February 1872. All matches were advertised in Scottish newspapers, but the players were drawn from those who played by Football Association rules – still limited at the time and largely consisting of only London-based Scottish players. England were victorious 1–0 in the November 1870 match, 2–1 in the November 1871 match and 1–0 in the February 1872 match; the February 1871 match was drawn 1–1. The only recorded attendance figure known is 650, from the second match. Formation data does not exist from three of the matches, but it is known that in the third and fifth matches both teams lined up with a '1–1–8' formation.

Results

Player appearances
The following players appeared in the five matches:

Reaction and the creation of international football

Following the games, there was resentment in Scotland that their team did not contain more home grown players. Alcock himself was categorical about where he felt responsibility for this fact lay, writing in the Scotsman newspaper:

"I must join issue with your correspondent in some instances. First, I assert that of whatever the Scotch eleven may have been composed the right to play was open to every Scotchman [Alcock's italics] whether his lines were cast North or South of the Tweed and that if in the face of the invitations publicly given through the columns of leading journals of Scotland the representative eleven consisted chiefly of Anglo-Scotians ... the fault lies on the heads of the players of the north, not on the management who sought the services of all alike impartially. To call the team London Scotchmen contributes nothing. The match was, as announced, to all intents and purposes between England and Scotland".

Many of the players in Scotland did not play to the FA's rules at the time, inhibiting the possibility of a truly representative match between the two countries. Eventually, the FA decided in its minutes of 3 October 1872 note that:

The challenge was eventually taken up by Queen's Park and this match, in 1872 is the earliest international football match recognised by FIFA, though at the time it was considered as a continuation of the previous internationals. In March 1873 the Scottish Football Association was created to support the coordination of football in Scotland, taking on responsibility for selecting Scottish teams, and the Football Association began to take the role as an English only organisation.

See also
:Category:England v Scotland representative footballers (1870–1872)
England national football team results (unofficial matches)
Scotland national football team results (unofficial matches)

References

External links
Matches on RSSSF website

1870
Unofficial Scotland national football team matches
Unofficial England national football team matches
1870–71 in English football
1871–72 in English football
1870–71 in Scottish football
1871–72 in Scottish football
1870 sports events in London
1871 sports events in London
1872 sports events in London
March 1870 sports events
November 1870 sports events
February 1871 sports events
November 1871 sports events
February 1872 sports events